Kiran Choudhary (born 5 June 1955) is an Indian National Congress politician. As the concerned minister she is involved in the Haryana Forestry scam case which is a multi-crore fake plantation scam. She is a MLA from Tosham Vidhan Sabha constituency and member of the Congress legislative Party in the Haryana Vidhan Sabha. The seat has also been represented in the assembly by her father-in-law Bansi Lal and late husband Surender Singh.

Kiran Chaudhry, known as Fire brand Women leader in Haryana lost her mother in April 2021.
Kiran Chaudhry believes in properly managed election campaigns and took personal meeting with workers and poll strategist from Vcsmedia time to time.

See also
 Haryana Forestry case
 Dynastic politics of Haryana

References

Haryana MLAs 2019–2024
Haryana MLAs 2014–2019
Indian National Congress politicians from Haryana
People from Bhiwani district
1955 births
Living people
People charged with corruption
21st-century Indian women politicians
Women members of the Haryana Legislative Assembly